Oscar Orlando Wolfe Jr. (December 10, 1890 - January 30, 1978) was an American farmer and Democratic state legislator in Mississippi. He served in the Mississippi House of Representatives and Mississippi Senate including a stint as president pro tempore. He lived in Duncan, Bolivar County, Mississippi.

Early life and career 
He was born in Terry, Mississippi, on December 10, 1890. He attended Mississippi A & M College and Soule Business College. After graduating, he moved to Beulah, Mississippi, where he briefly lived before moving to Duncan, Mississippi, in 1910. He began farming in 1912. He held several government positions in Duncan, including justice of the peace, town alderman and mayor. He represented Bolivar County in the Mississippi House of Representatives from 1932 to 1941 when he succeeded W. B. Roberts, who died, in the Mississippi State Senate. He then represented the 30th District in the Mississippi State Senate from 1942 to 1952, and was its president pro tempore from 1944 to 1948. Frank E. Smith defeated him in 1948 in a campaign for a seat in the U.S. Congress.

In 1961, he gave a statement on the challenges of farming in Mississippi and made recommendations for aiding farmers.

Political views 
He was a supporter of state superintendent of prisons Marvin E. Wiggins Sr.

Personal life and death 
He married Eva Jeffrey in 1913, and they were married until her death in 1930. He remarried to Elizabeth Jackson in 1938, and they were married until his death. Wolfe died of an apparent heart attack on January 30, 1978, at his home in Duncan, Mississippi. He was survived by one son and three daughters.

References

1890 births
1978 deaths
20th-century American politicians
Members of the Mississippi House of Representatives
People from Bolivar County, Mississippi
Farmers from Mississippi
People from Terry, Mississippi
Mississippi state senators
Presidents pro tempore of the Mississippi State Senate